The 1994–95 season was Sheffield Wednesday F.C.'s 128th season. They competed in the twenty-two team Premiership, the top tier of English football, finishing thirteenth.

Season summary
Sheffield Wednesday were among the pre-season favourites for a UEFA Cup places, having finished seventh in the first two Premiership seasons, third in the last First Division season in 1992 and winning the League Cup in 1991, with many fine players still on the club's payroll. But they were still without striker David Hirst for much of the season due to injury, and this played at least some part in the Owls enduring their worst league form since relegation in 1990.

Right up till early May, the Owls were in real danger of relegation and this was enough for the club's board, who wielded the axe on manager Trevor Francis after four years in charge. His successor was the former Luton Town and Tottenham Hotspur manager David Pleat, who looked to the continent in hope of returning the Owls to their winning ways and brought in Belgian forward Marc Degryse.

Final league table

Results summary

Results by round

Results
Sheffield Wednesday's score comes first

Legend

FA Premier League

FA Cup

League Cup

Players

First-team squad
Squad at end of season

Left club during season

Reserve squad

Transfers

In

Out

Transfers in:  £6,150,000
Transfers out:  £6,475,000
Total spending:  £325,000

References

Notes

Sheffield Wednesday F.C. seasons
Sheffield Wednesday